"Deadly Immunity" is an article written by Robert F. Kennedy, Jr. that appeared in the July 14, 2005 issue of Rolling Stone and, simultaneously, on the website Salon. The article is focused on the 2000 Simpsonwood CDC conference and claims that thimerosal-containing vaccines caused autism, as well as the conspiracy theory that government health agencies have "colluded with Big Pharma to hide the risks of thimerosal from the public." The article had originally been fact-checked and published in print by Rolling Stone, but posted online by Salon. The article was retracted by Salon on January 16, 2011, in response to criticisms of the article as inaccurate.

Reactions
"Deadly Immunity" was heavily criticized for quoting material out of context, and both Rolling Stone and Salon eventually amended the story with corrections in response to these and other criticisms. Such criticisms included that Kennedy had incorrectly claimed that the amount of mercury children received from thimerosal-containing vaccines was 187 times higher than the Environmental Protection Agency's limit for methylmercury exposure. The correction later posted to the article on Salon stated that the actual amount, 187 micrograms, is only 40% greater than this limit. Within days after running the piece, Salon had appended five corrections to it.

Retraction by Salon
On January 16, 2011, Salon announced that it was retracting "Deadly Immunity". In a statement on the website, Kerry Lauerman, Salon's editor-in-chief, explained that in addition to five corrections they had previously made to the story, "subsequent critics, including most recently, Seth Mnookin in his book "The Panic Virus," further eroded any faith we had in the story's value." Phil Plait hailed the retraction of the article, writing, "I applaud Salon for doing this, but wish it had been done years ago, or better, that Salon had never published Kennedy's piece at all."

References

External links
 Deadly Immunity. Internet Archive.

Rolling Stone articles
Thiomersal and vaccines
2005 works
Anti-vaccination in the United States